The 2014 Categoría Primera A season (officially known as the 2014 Liga Postobón season for sponsorship reasons) is the 67th season of Colombia's top-flight football league. Atlético Nacional come in as the defending champions having won both titles in the 2013 season.

Format
The format for the Apertura tournament will have a variation due to the 2014 FIFA World Cup and will be similar to the format used in 2011. It will be divided into three stages. The First Stage will be contested on a home-and-away basis, with each team playing the other teams once and playing a regional rival once more. The top eight teams after eighteen rounds will advance to a knockout round, where they will be pitted into four ties to be played on a home-and-away basis, with the four winners advancing to the semifinals and the winner of each semifinal advancing to the final of the tournament, which will be played on a home-and-away basis as well. The winner of the final will be declared the tournament champion and will participate in the 2015 Copa Libertadores. The Finalización tournament will keep the format used in the 2013 season.

Teams

Torneo Apertura

First stage
The First Stage began on January 24 and consisted of eighteen rounds and a series of regional rivalries on the ninth round. The top eight teams out of this stage will advance to the knockout stage. The first stage ended on April 20.

Standings

Results

Knockout round bracket

Quarterfinals

Semifinals

Finals

Top goalscorers

Source: Soccerway.com

Torneo Finalización

First stage
The First Stage began on July 18 and consisted of eighteen rounds and a series of regional rivalries on the ninth round. The top eight teams out of this stage advanced to the knockout stage. The first stage ended on November 9. Starting from this tournament, Itagüí will compete under the name Águilas Doradas since the club was expelled from Itagüí in May 2014, and will move to Pereira, playing their home games at Estadio Hernán Ramírez Villegas. The club eventually changed its name to Águilas Pereira in order to reflect this move.

Standings

Results

Semifinals
The Semifinal stage began on November 13 and ended on December 7. The eight teams that advanced were sorted into two groups of four teams. The winner of each group advanced to the finals.

Group A

Group B

Finals

Top goalscorers

Source: Liga Postobón

Relegation
A separate table is kept to determine the teams that get relegated to the Categoría Primera B for the next season. The table includes an average of all first stage games played for the current season and the previous two seasons.

Rules for classification: 1st average; 2nd goal difference; 3rd number of goals scored; 4th away goals scored.

Promotion/relegation playoff
The second worst team in the relegation table, Uniautónoma played Quindío, the 2014 Categoría Primera B runner-up, for a berth in the 2015 Categoría Primera A season. As the Primera A team, Uniautónoma played the second leg at home. The winner was determined by points, followed by goal difference, then a penalty shootout. Uniautónoma defeated Quindío 2-0 on aggregate score and will remain in the top tier for the 2015 season.

Aggregate table
An aggregate table including all games that a team plays during the year is used to determine First Stage berths to both the Copa Libertadores and the Copa Sudamericana. The best-placed non-champion will go to the first stage of the 2015 Copa Libertadores and the 2nd and 3rd best-placed non-champions will go to the first stage of the 2015 Copa Sudamericana.

References

External links 
 DIMAYOR's official website 

Categoría Primera A seasons
Categoria Primera A season
1